The Adventure Shop is a 1919 American silent adventure film directed by Kenneth S. Webb and starring Corinne Griffith, Walter McGrail and Robert Gaillard.

Plot

Cast
 Corinne Griffith as Phyllis Blake 
 Walter McGrail as Josephus Potts, Jr 
 Warren Chandler as Josephus Potts 
 Priestly Morrison as John Montgomery 
 Robert Gaillard as Franklin Herbert

References

Bibliography
 Koszarski, Richard. Hollywood on the Hudson: Film and Television in New York from Griffith to Sarnoff. Rutgers University Press, 2008.

External links

1919 films
1919 adventure films
American adventure films
Films directed by Kenneth Webb
American silent feature films
1910s English-language films
Vitagraph Studios films
American black-and-white films
Films with screenplays by George H. Plympton
1910s American films
Silent adventure films